Mydonomidae is a family of nematodes belonging to the order Dorylaimida.

Genera:
 Calolaimus Timm, 1964
 Morasia Baqri & Jairajpuri, 1969
 Mydonomus Thorne, 1964
 Paratimmus Baniyamuddin & Ahmad, 2009
 Scalpenchus Siddiqi, 1995

References

Nematodes